Andreas von Graben zu Sommeregg (15th century – 1463) was a Carinthian knight and nobleman residing at Sommeregg Castle. He served as a burgrave and castellan governor in the Ortenburg estates, held by the Counts of Celje until 1456.

Life

Family 
Born at Kornberg Castle in the Duchy of Styria, Andreas von Graben was a descendant of the noble (edelfrei) House of Graben family. He was the son of Friedrich I von Graben (d. 1422 at Kornberg Castle) and Katharina von Summeregk (Sommeregg); Burgrave Friedrich II von Graben was a brother of him. Andreas' nephew Ulrich III von Graben became a confidant of the Habsburg emperor Frederick III. Andreas` sister (?) Veronica von Graben (d. 1467) was married to Philipp Breuner (d. 1458), and  Elisabeth von Graben married with Georg von Auersperg (d. 1488).

Coat of arms 
Originally, the family of Andreas von Graben of Kornberg carried the coat of arms with the shovel (silver shovel on red), but adopted the oblique beam coat of arms (red, split by blue and silver) in Ortenburg services.

Career 
In 1431 or earlier, Andreas von Graben served as a captain (Hauptmann, a sort of stadtholder) of the former Ortenburg Estate which belonged to the Counts of Celje. In 1442 Count Frederick II of Celje enfeoffed Andreas von Graben with the Lordship, Burgraviate (a sort of viscount) of Sommeregg. which he chose as New family residence. In 1445 he was involved in the fierce feud between Count Henry VI of Gorizia and his wife Catherine of Gara and later supported the military campaigns of his bellicose liege lord Count Ulrich II of Celje. In 1450 he was also named as Burggraf of Sternberg, near Wernberg.

Upon the extinction of the Counts of Celje in 1456, their estates were seized by Emperor Frederick III of the Habsburg dynasty. He enforced a settlement with the Counts of Gorizia, whereupon Andreas von Graben had to renounce his conquests and also lost his office as stadtholder of the Ortenburg estates. Nevertheless, he still is documented as a liege lord around Vellach in 1458, and owner of Falkenstein Castle in 1462. He also had the parish churches of Treffling and Lieseregg (in present-day Seeboden) near his Sommeregg residence rebuilt. The castle became the Von Graben family seat for many years.

Marriage and issue 

Andreas von Graben married Barbara von Hallegg, daughter of Jörg von Hallegg (Hallecker), imperial counsellor and Administrator / Landeshauptmann of Carinthia. The couple had at least eight children
Heinrich von Graben (d. 1507)
Ernst von Graben (d. 1513), nobleman, served the Archbishops of Salzburg
Virgil von Graben (1430/1440-1507), succeeded his father as Burgrave of Sommeregg, administrator in the County of Gorizia, served the Habsburg emperors Frederick III and Maximilian I
Ruth von Graben
Cosmas von Graben (d. 1479), nobleman, Burgrave of Sanneck (Žovnek), served the Counts of Celje and the House of Habsburg 
Wolfgang von Graben, priest
Wolfgang Andreas von Graben, knighted by King Maximilian I in 1486 at his coronation in Aachen
Barbara von Graben, married to Ladislaus Prager

References

External links
 (de) Austro Archiv, "Beiträge zur Familiengeschichte Tirols", Graben von Stein
 Von Graben Forschung
 (de) Burg Sommeregg
 Rudolf Granichstaedten-Czerva (1948): "Brixen - Reichsfürstentum und Hofstaat".

1463 deaths
People from Carinthia (state)
Medieval Austrian knights
Year of birth unknown
15th-century Austrian people